is a Japanese football player who plays as Centre back. He currently play for FC Imabari, on loan from Fagiano Okayama.

Career
Wakaba Shimoguchi joined J2 League club Fagiano Okayama in 2017. On July 12, he debuted in Emperor's Cup (v AC Nagano Parceiro).

Club statistics
Updated to 29 August 2018.

References

External links

Profile at J. League
Profile at FC Imabari

1998 births
Living people
Association football people from Fukui Prefecture
Japanese footballers
J2 League players
J3 League players
Fagiano Okayama players
AC Nagano Parceiro players
FC Imabari players
Association football defenders